The Alaska Federation of Natives (AFN) is the largest statewide Native organization in Alaska. Its membership includes 178 villages (both federally recognized tribes and village corporations), thirteen regional native corporations, and twelve regional nonprofit and tribal consortiums that contract and run federal and state programs. AFN is governed by a 37-member board, which is elected by its membership at the annual convention held each October. The mission of AFN is to enhance and promote the cultural, economic and political voice of the entire Alaska native community.

History
The Alaska Federation of Natives was formed in October 1966, when Emil Notti called the gathering of 400 Alaska Natives representing 17 Native organizations gathered for a three-day conference to address Alaska Native aboriginal land rights. The 1968 discovery of oil at Prudhoe Bay prompted Native leaders to push for a land claims settlement with unprecedented urgency. It was officially incorporated on January 8, 1970. From 1966 to 1971, AFN worked primarily to achieve passage of a just and fair land settlement. On December 18, 1971, the Alaska Native Claims Settlement Act (ANCSA) was signed into law.

In the early- and mid-1970s, AFN provided technical assistance to help Alaska Natives implement ANCSA and set up the corporations mandated by the Act.

AFN was instrumental in the development and passage of federal laws including the Alaska National Interest Lands Conservation Act of 1980, and the 1987 Amendments to ANCSA (the "1991 legislation").

In the late 1980s, AFN turned its attention to social, tribal and economic issues.
At the state level, AFN plays an active role in the legislative process, promoting laws, policies and programs in areas such as health, education, resource development, labor and government.

Mission
Alaska Native or Native Alaskan people began as members of full sovereign nations and continue to enjoy a unique political relationship with the federal government. AFN will help Native Alaskan people survive and prosper as distinct ethnic and cultural groups who will participate fully as members of the overall society. The mission of AFN is to enhance and promote the cultural, economic and political voice of the entire Alaska Native community. AFN’s major goals are to:

 Advocate for Alaska Native people, their governments and organizations, with respect to federal, state and local laws;
 Foster and encourage preservation of Alaska Native cultures;
 Promote understanding of the economic needs of Alaska Natives and encourage development consistent with those needs;
 Protect, retain and enhance all lands owned by Alaska Natives and their organizations; and
 Promote and advocate for programs and systems which instill pride and confidence in individual Alaska Natives.

Annual convention
AFN's convention is the largest representative annual gathering in the United States of any Native peoples. Delegates are elected on a population formula of one representative per twenty-five Native residents in the area and delegate participation rates at the annual convention typically exceed 95%. 3,000 to 4,000 people attend each year, including 1,000 voting delegates from across the state  and the proceedings are broadcast live via television, radio and webcast reaching Alaska Natives and non-Natives alike from Russia, Utqiaġvik, Ketchikan, and from the Aleutian Chain to the Canada–US border. During the convention, the entire state of Alaska is blanketed with discussion on current events and issues. International observers are present at most meetings, both exchanging information and learning from the Alaska Native experience. Each year the convention adopts a theme.

Quyana Alaska
Their traditional dances remain the lifeblood of their culture and their communities: they sustain them and connect them with their rich cultural history. Passed from generation to generation, their dances ensure that the many distinct Native cultures across Alaska remain connected to their origins.

For over 20 years, Alaska Natives have come together in dance to celebrate Quyana Alaska during AFN’s Annual Convention. First introduced at the 1982 Convention, Quyana Alaska was designed to restore the traditional dances and ensure that they were passed on to the future generations. To date, over 200 different dance groups have performed at Native gatherings across the state. The cultural revival has certainly exploded across rural Alaska, and Quyana Alaska is now a treasured highlight of each and every Convention.

Denali Awards
The AFN's highest honor for people of non-native ancestry is named after the state's (and continent's) highest mountain. Recipients have included Tony Knowles and Ann Fienup-Riordan.

References

External links

 

1966 establishments in Alaska
501(c)(4) nonprofit organizations
Alaska Native culture in Anchorage
Alaska Native organizations
Native American rights organizations
Non-profit organizations based in Anchorage, Alaska
Organizations based in Alaska
Organizations established in 1966
Charities based in Alaska